Diaphania novicialis is a moth in the family Crambidae. It was described by William Schaus in 1912. It is found in Costa Rica and Colombia.

The length of the forewings is 11.5–13 mm for males and 11.5-12.3 mm for females. The costal band is very dark brown. There is yellowish on the terminal edge of the forewings and hindwings. The rest of the wing is white.

References

Moths described in 1912
Diaphania